David Frankham (born 16 February 1926) is a British retired actor. After serving in India and Malaya in the Second World War, Frankham worked first as a news reader, and then a writer, interviewer and producer for the BBC from 1948 to 1955.

In 1955, Frankham moved to Hollywood to pursue a career as an actor. He soon found work, appearing on five episodes of the live television programme Matinee Theatre. He worked steadily in television, as well as appearing in films such as Return of the Fly (1959), Ten Who Dared (1960), Master of the World (1961), Tales of Terror (1962), The Spiral Road (1962), King Rat (1965), and The Great Santini (1979). Frankham provided the voice of Sergeant Tibbs the cat in Walt Disney's One Hundred and One Dalmatians (1961).

He appeared in guest roles on American television from the late 1950s to the 1980s. His career peaked in the 1960s with frequent roles on such shows as Thriller, GE True, Twelve O'Clock High, The F.B.I., Gomer Pyle, U.S.M.C., The Beverly Hillbillies, The Outer Limits, Star Trek (episode "Is There in Truth No Beauty?"), then in Cannon, The Waltons, and McCloud during the 1970s.

In November 2012, Frankham's autobiography Which One Was David? was published by BearManor Media.

Partial filmography
Johnny Tremain (1957) - British Officer (uncredited)
Return of the Fly (1959) - Ronald Holmes, alias Alan Hinds
Ten Who Dared (1960) - Frank Goodman
One Hundred and One Dalmatians (1961) - Sergeant Tibbs (voice)
Master of the World (1961) - Phillip Evans
Tales of Terror (1962) - Dr. James (segment "The Case of M. Valdemar")
The Spiral Road (1962) - Drager's Replacement (uncredited)
King Rat (1965) - Cox
The Great Santini (1979) - Capt. Weber
Wrong Is Right (1982) - British Reporter
Ink: A Tale of Captivity (2010) - Country Gentleman (final film role)

External links

1926 births
Living people
20th-century English male actors
21st-century English male actors
British military personnel of World War II
English male film actors
English male television actors
English male voice actors
Male actors from Kent